Heydərabad (known as Golovinovka until 1999) is a village and municipality in the Saatly Rayon of Azerbaijan. According to the decision of the Milli Majlis of the Republic of Azerbaijan dated October 5, 1999, Dadli Gorgud village administrative-territorial unit of Saatli region was named Golovinovka village of Heydarabad.

Description 
It has a population of 685.

References

Populated places in Saatly District